Kenneth Othell Burrough (July 14, 1948 – February 24, 2022) was an American professional football player who was a wide receiver with the Houston Oilers in the National Football League (NFL). He was a track star and played quarterback at William M. Raines High School in Jacksonville, Florida, and played wide receiver at Texas Southern University in Houston, Texas, being named an All-American in 1969.

Career
Burrough was selected by the New Orleans Saints in the first round (10th overall) of the 1970 NFL Draft.  He missed much playing time his first season due to minor injuries, catching only 13 passes for 196 yards and two touchdowns. In January 1971, Burrough and fellow Saint player Dave Rowe were traded to the Oilers in exchange for Hoyle Granger, Terry Stoepel, Charles Blossom, and a draft choice to be named later.

Burrough played eleven seasons with the Oilers, from 1971 through 1981. In 1975, Burrough was selected to the Pro Bowl, leading all NFL wide receivers with 1,063 receiving yards, the only receiver to gain more than a thousand yards for the season. He scored eight touchdowns that year, and averaged 20.1 yards per reception. In his book, More Distant Memories: Pro Football's Best Ever Players of the 50s, 60s, and 70s, Danny Jones wrote that Burrough was "one of the most dangerous game breakers in the NFL along with Cliff Branch (Raiders), Mel Gray (Cardinals), and O. J. Simpson (Bills)." Six of Burrough's eight touchdowns were of 50 or greater yards. In a week thirteen game against the playoff-bound Raiders, Burrough caught four passes for 112 yards and two touchdowns, including a screen pass from quarterback Dan Pastorini which he turned into a 68-yard touchdown with his open field running skills.

Burrough was also selected to the Pro Bowl in 1977.  The Oilers won post-season games in the 1978 and 1979 seasons, making it to the AFC Championship both years, but lost to the Pittsburgh Steelers, the eventual Super Bowl champions.

Burrough has the third most receiving yards in Oilers/Titans history with 6,906 and tied for third in receiving touchdowns with 47. He ranks 85th on NFL All-Time Yards per Reception List with 16.9 yards per pass reception.

Later life and death
In 2016, Burrough was inducted into the Black College Football Hall of Fame.

Burrough died in Jacksonville, Florida, on February 24, 2022, at the age of 73.

References

External links
 

1948 births
2022 deaths
African-American players of American football
Players of American football from Jacksonville, Florida
William M. Raines High School alumni
American football wide receivers
Texas Southern Tigers football players
New Orleans Saints players
Houston Oilers players
American Conference Pro Bowl players